Shaun Lee Goodwin (born 14 June 1969) is an English former footballer and manager.

Career
Goodwin started his career with Rotherham United in July 1987. He made 280 appearances and scored 39 goals in the Football League for the club before joining non-league side Doncaster Rovers. Whilst at Rotherham he was a part of the team that won the 1996 Football League Trophy Final. He also played for Altrincham and Gainsborough Trinity.

He was appointed as Maltby Main's manager in 2002 and left the club in January 2005.

Honours
PFA Team of the Year: 1989–90 Third Division, 1991–92 Fourth Division

References

1969 births
Living people
Footballers from Rotherham
English footballers
Association football midfielders
Rotherham United F.C. players
Doncaster Rovers F.C. players
Altrincham F.C. players
Gainsborough Trinity F.C. players
English football managers
Maltby Main F.C. managers